Steel wool, also known as iron wool, wire wool or wire sponge, is a bundle of very fine and flexible sharp-edged steel filaments. It was described as a new product in 1896.  It is used as an abrasive in finishing and repair work for polishing wood or metal objects, cleaning household cookware, cleaning windows, and sanding surfaces.

Steel wool is made from low-carbon steel in a process similar to broaching, where a heavy steel wire is pulled through a toothed die that removes thin, sharp, wire shavings.

Uses

Steel wool is commonly used by woodworkers, metal craftsmen, and jewelers to clean and smooth working surfaces and give them shine.
However, when used on oak, remaining traces of iron may react with tannins in the wood to produce blue or black iron stain, and when used on aluminum, brass, or other non-ferrous metal surfaces may cause after-rust which will dull and discolor the surface. Bronze wool and stainless steel wool will not cause these undesirable effects.

Steel wool is often used for professional cleaning processes on glass and porcelain because it is softer than those materials and is able to scrape off deposits without scratching the underlying surface like common abrasives. In many countries, soap-impregnated steel wool pads were sold under various trade names including Brillo Pad, Chore Boy, and S.O.S Soap Pad for household cleaning, although those products sometimes no longer contain steel wool.

Another use for steel wool is in rodent control. Small holes are plugged with coarse grade steel wool, which, if gnawed on by rodents, causes extreme pain in the mouth and, if ingested, severe internal damage may lead to death.

When steel wool is heated or allowed to rust, it increases in mass due to the combination of oxygen with iron.

The fine cross-section of steel wool makes it combustible in air. 
Light painting, where many sparks are released, is one application.
Very fine steel wool can also be used as tinder in emergency situations, as it burns even when wet and can be ignited by fire, a spark, or by connecting a battery to produce joule heating.

Grades
Steel wool products are supplied in grades from the coarser grades 3 and 4 to the super fine grade 0000.  Rust-resistant (stainless) steel wool is also available.

See also
 Bronze wool
 Glass wool
 Mineral wool
 Polishing
 Wood finishing

References

Cleaning products
Metalworking
Abrasives
Steel
Steel objects